The Intercity Viaduct (officially the Lewis and Clark Viaduct since 1969) is an automobile and pedestrian crossing of the Kansas River in the United States. Designed by Waddell and Hedrick, this four lane, two level deck truss bridge opened to the public on January 29, 1907. It rises above the West Bottoms, and several sets of railroad tracks. It was the first roadway bridge to connect Kansas City, Missouri, with Kansas City, Kansas, non-stop all the way across.

The eastbound lanes were built as the Intercity Viaduct, carrying both east and west lanes, but renamed the Lewis and Clark Viaduct on January 25, 1969, taking the name of its sister bridge that would now carry the westbound lanes, built in 1962 to the north.

History

Designed by the engineering firm Waddell and Hedrick in 1903, the viaduct followed a flood that same year that wiped out all but one of the 17 bridges that spanned the Kaw River. Ground broke to mark the building of the bridge in 1905. In 1907, Bridge opens to two lanes of toll traffic, with streetcar tracks. In 1908, Bridge survives 1908 flood. In 1911, Bank forecloses the bridge because the toll did not cover the bridge's cost. In 1917, Bridge purchased by Kansas City, Kansas, and Kansas City, Missouri. In 1918, Ribbon cutting ceremony held to open bridge to free traffic under city control and ownership. In 1930: Steel deck truss beams converted to a lower level, two lane automobile deck. In 1936, Streetcar rails removed, and bridge opened to four lanes of traffic on upper level. In 1951, Bridge survives 1951 Kansas City flood, the only bridge to remain open to traffic during the flood.1962, The Lewis and Clark Viaduct is built to the north, old steel piers tubed off, and coated with concrete. In 1969, Bridge renamed the Lewis and Clark Viaduct after its sister bridge. In 1993, Bridge survives 1993 Kansas City flood.In 1999-2000, Lower level of original (eastbound) bridge rehabilitated for pedestrian and bicycle access. In 2007, Bridge turns 100 years of age, and several people gather from West Bottoms on the same day it opened in 1907, holding lights to the bridge in honor of its 100 years of service. In 2018, Westbound side of bridge demolished and reconstructed over the Kansas River. In 2021, Westbound side reopened. It was delayed due the flooding in 2019. Eastbound side closed for demolition and reconstruction.

See also

References

Bridges over the Kansas River
Bridges in Kansas City, Kansas
Bridges in Kansas City, Missouri
Interstate 70
Bridges completed in 1907
Bridges completed in 1962
Truss bridges in the United States
Viaducts in the United States
Road bridges in Missouri
Road bridges in Kansas
U.S. Route 24
U.S. Route 40
U.S. Route 169
Bridges on the Interstate Highway System
Bridges of the United States Numbered Highway System
Former toll bridges in Kansas
Former toll bridges in Missouri